Anhui Litian F.C. is a Chinese football club based in Anqing, Anhui Province.

History
The club was original founded on August 25, 2014 when the local Sports Bureau of Anhui Province along with funding from the Anhui Litian Group (安徽力天集团) formed Anhui Litian F.C. while registration with the Chinese Football Association (CFA) was officially completed on September 3, 2014. In the club's debut season they went on to win the 2014 China Amateur Football League East Zone and advanced to the national stage where they ended finishing ninth. After their successful debut season the club's management were allowed to register the club as a professional football team and play in the third tier by the CFA. In the club's first season as a professional entity the owners were looking for an immediate progression up the Chinese football league pyramid, however the team's Head coach Shang Qing failed to deliver a play-off spot and was replaced by Ding Wei as a caretaker. On July 1, 2015 Darko Nović came in as Head coach, however he too was unable to guide the club to a play-off position at the end of the season. After the 2015 season, they ceded their first team as well as their place in China League Two to Heilongjiang Lava Spring, and competes only in youth competitions.

In 2021, they re-established their first team squad and participated in the 2021 Chinese Champions League, but finished last in the group stage.

Results

References

Football clubs in China
Heilongjiang Ice City F.C.
Sport in Anhui
Organizations based in Anhui
Hefei